Hansjörg Raffl (born 29 January 1958 in Olang) is an Italian luger who competed from the late 1970s to the mid-1990s. Competing in five Winter Olympics, he won two medals in the men's doubles event with a silver in 1994 and a bronze in 1992.

Raffl also won nine medals at the FIL World Luge Championships with two gold (Men's doubles: 1990, Mixed team: 1989), four silvers (1983, 1989, 1993; Mixed team: 1990), and three bronzes (Men's doubles: 1991, Mixed team: 1991, 1993).

He also won nine medals in the FIL European Luge Championships with two gold (Men's doubles: 1992, 1994), two silvers (Men's doubles: 1988, 1990), and five bronzes (Men's doubles: 1984, 1986; Mixed team: 1988, 1990, 1992).

Raffll also won 26 World Cup races and eight World Cup overall men's doubles titles (1982-3, 1984-5, 1985-6, 1988-9, 1989–90, 1990-1, 1991-2, 1992-3). His best World Cup overall finish in the men's singles was second in 1978-9.

References

1980 luge men's doubles results
1984 luge men's doubles results
1988 luge men's singles results
1992 luge men's doubles results
1994 luge men's doubles results

1958 births
People from Olang
Italian male lugers
Living people
Lugers at the 1980 Winter Olympics
Lugers at the 1984 Winter Olympics
Lugers at the 1988 Winter Olympics
Lugers at the 1992 Winter Olympics
Lugers at the 1994 Winter Olympics
Olympic lugers of Italy
Olympic medalists in luge
Medalists at the 1992 Winter Olympics
Medalists at the 1994 Winter Olympics
Olympic silver medalists for Italy
Olympic bronze medalists for Italy
Germanophone Italian people
Sportspeople from Südtirol